CISA or Cisa may refer to:

Computing and law
 Certified Information Systems Auditor, a professional certification for information technology audit professionals sponsored by ISACA
 Cybersecurity Information Sharing Act, a US law which allows sharing of Internet traffic information between the government and companies

Organizations
 China Iron and Steel Association, a national, non-profit organization founded in 1999 on the basis of China Metallurgical Enterprise Management Association
 Costruzioni Italiane Serrature e Affini, an Italian manufacturer of locking and access control systems
 Cybersecurity and Infrastructure Security Agency, U.S. federal cybersecurity agency, overseen by DHS; formed in November 2018

Education and research
 Canadian Institute for the Study of Antisemitism, an academic institute based in Winnipeg and Toronto
 Centre for Intelligent Systems and their Applications, School of Informatics, University of Edinburgh
 Council of International Students Australia, peak representative body for international students studying in Australia
 Swiss Center for Affective Sciences, in Geneva

Other uses
 CISA-DT, a television station in Canada
 Cisa (goddess), a goddess in Germanic paganism

See also

 Kisa (disambiguation)
 Sisa (disambiguation)
 Zisa (disambiguation)